Mallory Christina Ervin (born October 26, 1985) is an American YouTube personality, former entertainer and former beauty pageant titleholder from Morganfield, Kentucky. She held the title of Miss Kentucky 2009 and was 4th runner-up to Miss America 2010. In September 2010, it was announced that she competed on The Amazing Race 17 with her father Gary Ervin. The Amazing Race was filmed in May and June 2010 and premiered on September 26, 2010. Gary and Mallory were also one of the teams to return for The Amazing Race 18, which premiered on February 20, 2011. Ervin returned to the race to join Mark Jackson in The Amazing Race 24: All Stars, after Jackson's teammate William "Bopper" Minton was deemed unfit to race due to health reasons.

Miss Kentucky
Ervin won the title of Miss Kentucky on July 18, 2009, when she received her crown from outgoing titleholder Emily Cox. She is a graduate of the Sewanee: The University of the South in Tennessee with a degree in Theater Arts. Her platform was Autism Awareness. Her talent was a vocal performance.

The Amazing Race
Gary and Mallory's best placements on The Amazing Race 17 were three consecutive second-place finishes (leg 3, leg 4 and leg 5). They were eliminated in the 8th leg, finishing in 6th place.

Season 17 Finishes
 6th (leg 1)
 9th (leg 2)
 2nd (leg 3)
 2nd (leg 4)
 2nd (leg 5)
 6th (leg 6)
 4th (leg 7)
 6th (leg 8/eliminated)

On The Amazing Race 18: Unfinished Business, Gary and Mallory achieved three first-place finishes, two second-place finishes and two third-place finishes. The team made last place in the 8th leg and had to perform a penalty task in the 9th leg to be allowed to continue racing. Ultimately, Mallory and her father placed 3rd out of the 11 teams in the final leg, losing to Harlem Globetrotters of Flight Time & Big Easy (runner-up) and Sisters of Kisha & Jen, who won the race.

Season 18 Finishes
 1st (leg 1)
 9th (leg 2)
 2nd (leg 3)
 3rd (leg 4)
 2nd (leg 5)
 1st (leg 6)
 4th (leg 7)
 6th (leg 8/Non-elimination leg)
 4th (leg 9)
 3rd (leg 10)
 1st (leg 11)
 3rd (Final Leg)

On The Amazing Race 24: All-Stars, Mallory joined Mark Jackson after his teammate William "Bopper" Minton was deemed unfit to race due to pancreatitis. They finished in 6th place in the 1st leg, but then they were eliminated in the 2nd leg, finishing in 10th place.

References

External links
 
 Official Miss America Profile
 Gary & Mallory's The Amazing Race 17 Official Profile
 Gary & Mallory's The Amazing Race 18 Official Profile
 Mark & Mallory's The Amazing Race 24 Official Profile

1985 births
Living people
American beauty pageant winners
American bloggers
American entertainers
American YouTubers
American women bloggers
Eastern Kentucky University alumni
Beauty pageants in Kentucky
Miss America 2010 delegates
Miss Kentucky winners
People from Henderson, Kentucky
People from Morganfield, Kentucky
People from Nashville, Tennessee
Writers from Lexington, Kentucky
Sewanee: The University of the South alumni
The Amazing Race (American TV series) contestants